Han Hyun-hee (born June 25, 1993) is a South Korean relief pitcher who plays for the Kiwoom Heroes of the KBO League. He bats and throws right-handed.

Amateur career
Han was born in Seoul. He attended Kyungnam High School in Busan. In May 2010 Han led his team to the national championship at the 65th Blue Dragon Flag National Championship, allowing only one earned run in 10 innings pitched as the team's closer. Han threw a no-hitter on June 9, 2011, allowing two walks and striking out 17 batters with 104 pitches against Gaesung High School in the Gyeongsang regional preliminary league for the 65th Golden Lion Flag National Championship where he racked up three consecutive complete game shutout wins with 39 strikeouts in 27 innings pitched.

In August 2011 Han was selected as a member of the South Korean U-18 national team for the Asian Junior Baseball Championship held in Yokohama, Japan. Han was summoned to close the semifinal game against Chinese Taipei in the eighth inning. He earned a win, hurling three innings and allowing one unearned run in South Korea's 4–3 victory to Chinese Taipei.

On September 23, 2018, he became the first holder to win 10 games against SK.

Notable international appearances

Professional career
Han made himself eligible for the 2012 KBO Draft and was selected as the second overall pick in the draft by the Nexen Heroes.

Pitching styles
As a sidearm pitcher Han combines a fastball that averages early 90 mph with a curveball and a circle changeup.

References

External links 
 Profile and stats on the KBO official website

South Korean baseball players
Kiwoom Heroes players
KBO League pitchers
1993 births
Living people
Kyungnam High School alumni
Asian Games medalists in baseball
Baseball players at the 2014 Asian Games
Medalists at the 2014 Asian Games
Asian Games gold medalists for South Korea
Baseball players from Seoul